SS Rastrello was an Italian cargo ship that was sunk in a British air raid on 16 June 1940 in Naples, Italy.

Construction 
Rastrello was built at the Irvine's Shipbuilding & Drydock Co. Ltd. shipyard in Hartlepool, United Kingdom in January 1904. Where she was launched and completed that same year. The ship could reach a maximum speed of 11 knots and could generate 212 n.h.p. thanks to her two boilers.

First World War Capture 
Despite being built as the British cargo ship Navarre, Rastrello was sold to Norway for 900.000 NOK in 1911 alongside SS Narbonne and renamed Atle Jarl. Rastrello (then Atle Jarl) was taken to Kiel, Germany and used by the Kaiserliche Marine as a headquarters for the defense of Kiel and as an accommodation ship for mine warfare research.

Interbellum and First Sinking 
After the war in 1919, Rastrello (at this time still named Atle Jarl) was again used as a cargo ship by the new German government with her home port in Hamburg, Germany. Disaster would strike Rastrello that same year as on 20 November 1919 she sank after hitting a mine near Öland, Sweden while she was on a voyage from Luleå, Sweden to Amsterdam, the Netherlands with a cargo of wood. She was refloated on 28 June 1920 and repaired, re-entering to service that same year.

World War II and Final Sinking 
Rastrello finally received her name when she was bought by Italy in May 1937 with her new homeport in Genoa, Italy. On 16 June 1940 Rastrello was moored in the port of Naples, Italy, when she was sunk by a torpedo fired accidentally by the torpedo boat . There were no casualty.

Wreck 
The wreck of Rastrello was lifted and broken up not long after she sank.

References

1904 ships
Ships built in the United Kingdom
Cargo ships
Steamships of Italy
Ships sunk by British aircraft
Ships sunk with no fatalities
Shipwrecks in the Mediterranean Sea
World War II shipwrecks in the Mediterranean Sea
Maritime incidents in 1919
Maritime incidents in June 1940